Louise is a 1939 French musical film directed by Abel Gance. It was screened out of competition at the 1987 Cannes Film Festival.

Described as "wonderfully atmospheric", the film is based on the opera of the same name by Gustave Charpentier. Charpentier remained on the set throughout the filming and personally coached Grace Moore, who played the title role. Both Georges Thill, who played Julien and André Pernet who played Louise's father, were famous exponents of those roles on the opera stage and had recorded them in 1935.

Cast
 Grace Moore as Louise
 Georges Thill as Julien
 André Pernet as Le père de Louise
 Suzanne Desprès as La mère de Louise
 Robert Le Vigan as Gaston
 Ginette Leclerc as Lucienne
 Edmond Beauchamp as Le philosophe (as Beauchamp)
 Jacqueline Gauthier as Alphonsine
 Rivers Cadet
 Pauline Carton as La première
 Roger Blin as Un rapin

References

External links

1939 films
1939 musical films
French musical films
French black-and-white films
Films directed by Abel Gance
Films based on operas
Opera films
1930s French films